Ghisonaccia is a commune of the Haute-Corse department of France on the island of Corsica.

Population

See also 
 Communes of the Haute-Corse department
 Former railway station

References

Communes of Haute-Corse
Haute-Corse communes articles needing translation from French Wikipedia